The Reynolda House Museum of American Art displays a premiere collection of American art ranging from the colonial period to the present.  Built in 1917 by Katharine Smith Reynolds and her husband R. J. Reynolds, founder of the R. J. Reynolds Tobacco Company, the house originally occupied the center of a  estate. It opened to the public as an institution dedicated to the arts and education in 1965, and as an art museum in 1967. The house holds one of the country's finest collections of American paintings. It is located in Winston-Salem, North Carolina.

History
Design and construction began in 1912 and lasted until the end of 1917. Charles Barton Keen, who had gained success designing homes in Pennsylvania and New York, was the architect of not only the main house, but also the village on the estate that included a church, stables, and a school. Katharine Reynolds was very involved with the design of Reynolda, and some of her correspondence with Keen survives. The family finally moved in December 1917, but R. J. Reynolds was ill with pancreatic cancer and was not able to enjoy his new home. He died July 29, 1918.

Reynolda was the home of two generations of the Reynolds family.  In 1935, Mary Reynolds Babcock, the elder daughter, acquired the estate.  She and her husband Charles Babcock used the house as their vacation home until 1948, when they moved permanently to Reynolda.  The property remained in the family for nearly 50 years.  The museum restored its rooms and furnishings to reflect the periods when the family lived there. The iconic green Ludowici terra cotta tile roof influenced many other prominent homes and architecture around Winston-Salem. Reynolda became affiliated with Wake Forest University in 2002.

Features

Located on Reynolda Road, a large portion of Reynolda can be explored on foot.  In addition to the house, 28 of the original thirty buildings remain.  To the west lie the restored formal gardens with Japanese cryptomeria and weeping cherry trees.  The  lake behind the house ("Lake Katharine") has reverted to wetlands which provide a home for a variety of wildlife.  Many of the buildings in the village are occupied by boutiques, shops, and restaurants.  A short walk across the dam leads from the village to Wake Forest University, which was built on land donated from the grounds of Reynolda House to the college by Mary and Charles Babcock.

A French restaurant, La Chaudiere, once occupied the family's former boiler room, but closed in the 1990s.

Permanent collection
Reynolda House Museum of American Art houses a permanent collection of American art and sculpture from three centuries. The artists featured in the collection include Mary Cassatt, Frederic Church, Jacob Lawrence, Georgia O'Keeffe, and Gilbert Stuart. Most of the pieces are displayed throughout the historic house.

Selected collection highlights

Exhibitions
In 2005, Reynolda House opened the Mary and Charlie Babcock Wing which features a gallery space for traveling exhibitions. There are usually two shows featured in that space every year, one in the fall and one in the spring. There are other exhibitions throughout the year in the Northeast and West Bedrooms in the house.

Past exhibitions
Love & Loss , October 11, 2014 - December 13, 2015
Romare Bearden: A Black Odyssey, October 13, 2012 - January 13, 2013
Domestic Bliss: Art at Home in Britain and America, 1780-1840, December 17, 2011 - May 20, 2012
Modern Masters from the Smithsonian Art Museum, October 7, 2011 - December 31, 2011
Trains that Passed in the Night: The Photographs of O. Winston Link, February 19, 2011 - June 19, 2011
Virtue, Vice, Wisdom & Folly: The Moralizing Tradition in American Art, September 18, 2010 - December 31, 2010
William Christenberry: Photographs, 1961-2005, February 13, 2010 - June 27, 2010
The American Expatriates: Cassatt, Sargent, and Whistler, December 5, 2009 - April 5, 2010
Now/Then: A Journey in Collecting Contemporary Art at Wake Forest University, October 31, 2009 - December 31, 2009
The Andes of Ecuador: Science and Spectacle, September 26, 2009 - September 30, 2010
Heroes of Horticulture, July 31, 2009 - September 27, 2009
The Stieglitz Circle: Beyond O'Keeffe, June 6, 2009 - November 15, 2009
Figures in Bronze: Sculpture at Reynolda, April 14, 2009 - August 30, 2009
American Impressions: Selections from the National Academy Museum, February 28, 2009 - June 28, 2009
Chuck Close: The Keith Series, January 17, 2009 - May 31, 2009
Seeing the City: Sloan's New York, October 4, 2008 - January 4, 2009
New World Views: Gifts from Jean Crutchfield and Robert Hobbs, May 20, 2008 - August 31, 2008
Early American Portraits, May 13, 2008 - March 16, 2009
Ancestry and Innovation: African American Art from the American Folk Art Museum, February 2, 2008 - April 13, 2008
Wordplay: Text and Modern Art, November 13, 2007 - May 4, 2008
Wings of Adventure: Smith Reynolds and the Flight of 898 Whiskey, September 8, 2007 - December 30, 2007
A Country Takes Shape, June 27, 2007 - December 1, 2008
The Art of Dance, April 3, 2007 - September 16, 2007
Abstract/Object: Mid-Twentieth Century Art from the Reynolda House Collection, February 27, 2007 - June 17, 2007
Grandma Moses: Grandmother to the Nation, January 27, 2007 - April 22, 2007
Modern Fun! Prints from the '70s and '80s, October 3, 2006 - January 28, 2007
Self/Image: Portraiture from Copley to Close, August 30, 2006 - December 30, 2006
American Watercolors 1880 - 1965, July 1, 2006 - January 1, 2007
Moving Pictures: American Art and Early Film, 1880-1910, March 10, 2006 - July 16, 2006
J.M.W. Turner and Frederic Church: An Atlantic Conversation, November 15, 2005 - February 5, 2006
Paper, Leather, Wood: Materials and African American Art of the Twentieth Century, November 15, 2005 - April 16, 2006
Diane Arbus: Family Albums, September 15, 2005 - December 4, 2005
Vanguard Collecting: American Art at Reynolda House, April 1, 2005 - August 21, 2005

See also
Reynolda Historic District, listed on the National Register of Historic Places

References

External links

Art museums and galleries in North Carolina
Houses in Winston-Salem, North Carolina
Museums of American art
Museums in Winston-Salem, North Carolina
Historic house museums in North Carolina
Art museums established in 1967
1967 establishments in North Carolina
Former private collections in the United States
Reynolds family residences